The Twelve Apostles is a stone circle near Ilkley and Burley in Wharfedale in West Yorkshire, England.

Location
Located on Rombalds Moor which is found between Ilkley Moor and Burley Moor, the Twelve Apostles are located within the parish of Burley in Wharfedale.

Description
The Twelve Apostles consists of the remains of a stone circle with a diameter of about 15 metres. The circle originally had between 16 and 20 stones, but it is now reduced to 12 stones. The stones are made from the local millstone grit. All of the stones were fallen by the mid-20th-century and were lying loose upon the ground.

The bank was still traceable in the 1920s but has apparently eroded since then due to visitors walking over the ground. At the centre of the circle was a small mound, which may have been the disturbed remains of a burial cairn.

In 1971 a group of amateurs made an unauthorised attempt to re-erect the fallen stones, but the stones soon fell again. The stones have since been re-erected. It is not clear who re-erected them, nor when. The site suffers severe visitor erosion, as it was formerly hidden beneath heather, but is now in an area of bare trampled soil. It is regarded as one of the most damaged prehistoric sites in West Yorkshire.

Notes

External links

Stone circles in England
Archaeological sites in West Yorkshire